The Heard Island glaciers covered 79 percent of Heard Island itself, in 1947, covering 288 km2; by 1988, this had decreased by 11 percent to 257 km2. The glaciers fall under the Antarctic Environmental Gradient, which spans 30 degrees of latitude and includes a range of macro-climatic zones from cool temperate islands to the frigid and arid Antarctic continent. Glaciers extend from 2745 m to sea level, with ice up to 150 m deep. The geologic movement of the glaciers can appear fast-flowing due to the steep slope and high precipitation, and are particularly sensitive to climatic fluctuations. Measurements between 1947 and 1980 show glacial retreat, particularly on the eastern flanks, is correlated with changes in weather patterns.

A 29% reduction in area of the Brown Glacier from 1947-2003 was observed. The volcano Big Ben, from which all the glaciers drain, has shown no sign of changing geothermal output to cause the melting; a 1 degree Celsius warming has occurred over the same time period. Glaciologists continue to study the Brown Glacier, detailing surveys of the glacier's snout and surface, which determine if glacial retreat is rapid or punctuated.

Measurements on the mass balance of the glacier, as well as more detailed ice thickness measurements using a portable radar echo sounder, were undertaken. Monitoring of climatic conditions continues, with emphasis on the impact of Foehn winds on glacier mass balance.

An expedition by scientists from the Australian Antarctic Division recently visited the volcanic island in 2009, observing glaciers that had retreated 50 metres in three years.  Repairs were made to an automatic weather station established in November 2000.

Glaciologist Dr. Ian Allison cites that the latest aerial surveys that show continuous rapid melt and that satellite imagery shows the island double in size due to volcanic activity.

Glacier changes

Changes before 1955
 No apparent change between 1874–1902 or 1902–1929
 Minor recession in a few places by 1947 and widespread by 1954.
 Marked changes occurred in the ice formation above 5000 ft (1500 m) on the southwestern slopes of Big Ben between 1949–1954 (possibly volcanic activity (Padang, 1963)

Changes since 1955
 The major recession in 1963 was obvious below 2000 ft (600 m) on almost all glaciers, and minor recession was evident as high as 5000 ft.
 Winston Glacier retreated approximately one mile (1.6 km) between 1947 and 1963.
 Striking retreat on the coast north-west of Spit Bay.
 Disappearance of coastal ice cliffs 50 ft high off Brown and Stephenson Glaciers by 1963. Glaciers terminated as much as 100 yards inland.
 Marked recession since 1955 of Baudissin Glacier on the north coast, Vahsel Glacier on the west coast, and Jacka Glacier on the east coast of Laurens Peninsula.
 1965 observations suggest a possible readvance of two glaciers:
 Winston Glacier had increased in thickness at its terminus, and some moraine overthrust was apparent at the northeastern seaward edge of Stephenson Glacier. Overthrusts had also been seen in 1963 on the north lateral moraine of Baudissin Glacier.

Possible causes of terminus change

Volcanic activity
Volcanic activity may have caused the glacier changes above 5000 ft between 1949 and 1955 but such activity seems to be minor and localized. It cannot explain the widespread glacier retreat that has occurred since 1955. Snow is a poor conductor of heat, and the meltwater quickly becomes steam, resulting in a dampened response. The thin deposits of volcanic ash will reduce albedo and accelerate melt, but thicker deposits of debris and cooled lava will remain on the snow or ice for many years, insulating it against solar radiation and thus reducing melt.

Some of the volcano Big Ben's activities include a major eruption which was observed in 1910, incandescent lava reported in 1950, and new fumaroles seen above 5000 ft on the south western slopes of Big Ben in 1949; these were still active in 1954 but were not seen in 1963 or 1965.

Southward movement of the Antarctic Convergence
The southward movement of the Antarctic Convergence might cause glacier retreat through a rise in sea and air temperature. However, there is no evidence of a change in the Antarctic Convergence's mean position.  Because the Antarctic Convergence in the Kerguelen Islands region is not well known, its position there is the subject of considerable disagreement (Meinardus, 1923; Mackintosh, 1946; Ostapoff, 1965; Soviet Antarctic Expedition, 1966).

Climatic change
Evidence of a probable change in the wind regime at Heard Island within the past century implies climate change is a real factor for terminus retreat. Sealers' observations (1856–1859) showed fewer south-westerly and more northerly winds than did those made by ANARE (1948–1955).

Individual glaciers

References